Lahti is a city and municipality in Finland. It is the capital of the region of Päijänne Tavastia (Päijät-Häme) and its growing region is one of the main economic hubs of Finland. It is also situated at the intersection of Highway 4 (between Helsinki and Jyväskylä) and Highway 12 (between Tampere and Kouvola), which are the most significant main roads of Lahti.

In English, the Finnish word Lahti literally means bay. Lahti is also dubbed the "Chicago of Finland" due to the early industries of both cities, when they were known as "slaughterhouse cities". Also, the troubled history of both cities in the field of crime has been seen as one of the similarities.

Lahti is a long-time pioneering city in environmental sustainability, dating back to as early as 1990 and before. The European Commission has named Lahti as the European Green Capital of 2021. 

Lahti is the headquarters of the Salpausselkä UNESCO Global Geopark, one of 4 UNESCO Geoparks in Finland. Salpausselkä was added to the list of over 170 UNESCO Global Geoparks in the world in 2022.

The coat of arms of the city depicts a train wheel surrounded by flames. It refers to the Riihimäki–Saint Petersburg railway, which had a decisive influence on the birth of the city at its crossroads.

History
Lahti was first mentioned in documents in 1445. The village belonged to the parish of Hollola and was located at the medieval trade route of Ylinen Viipurintie, which linked the towns of Hämeenlinna and Viipuri.

The completion of the Riihimäki – St. Petersburg railway line in 1870 and the Vesijärvi canal in 1871 turned Lahti into a lively station, and industrial installations began to spring up around it. For a long time, the railway station at Vesijärvi Harbour was the second busiest station in Finland. Craftsmen, merchants, a few civil servants and a lot of industrial workers soon mixed in with the existing agricultural peasantry.

On 19 June 1877, almost the entire village was burned to the ground. However, the accident proved to be a stroke of luck for the development of the place, as it led to the authorities resuming their deliberations about establishing a town in Lahti. The village was granted market town rights by Emperor Alexander II of Russia in 1878 and an empire-style, grid town plan was approved, which included a large market square and wide boulevards. This grid plan still forms the basis of the city center. Most of the buildings were low wooden houses bordering the streets.

Lahti was founded during a period of severe economic recession. The Russian Empire was encumbered by the war against Turkey. The recession also slowed down the building of the township: land would not sell and often plots were not built on for some time. In its early years, the town with its meagre 200 inhabitants was too small to provide any kind of foundation for trade. At the end of the 1890s, Lahti's Township Board increased its efforts to enable Lahti to be turned into a city. In spring 1904, the efforts finally bore fruit as the Senate approved of the application, although it was another eighteen months before Tsar Nicholas II finally gave his blessing and issued an ordinance for establishing the city of Lahti.

At the end of 1905, the area that now comprises Lahti accommodated around 8,200 people of whom just under 3,000 lived in the city itself. All essential municipal institutions were built in just ten years, including a hospital and a city hall. At the same time, a rapid increase in brick houses was taking place in the centre of the city. The Battle of Lahti was fought in the 1918 Finnish Civil War as the German Detachment Brandenstein took the town from the Reds.

In the early 1920s, the city gained possession of the grounds of the Lahti Manor, an important piece of land previously blocking the city from the lake. Large-scale industrial operations grew rapidly in the 1930s as did the population; Lahti, at the time, was one of Finland's fastest-growing cities, and before the start of the Winter War its population was approaching 30,000.

Through the addition of new areas in 1924, 1933 and 1956, Lahti grew, both in terms of population and surface area. The increase in population was especially strong after WWII, when 10,000 evacuees from ceded territories were settled in the city, and then later in the 1960s and 1970s as a result of urbanization. The rapid population growth came to a sharp end in 1975 and the city has since grown significantly slower albeit more steadily, with the latest notable growth in population happening in 2016 when the municipality of Nastola became a part of Lahti.

In December 2018, Lahti became the first new university city in Finland after Rovaniemi in 1979 when the Parliament accepted a change in the university law. LUT University nowadays consists of two campuses, Lappeenranta and Lahti.

Geography 

The terrain of Lahti is dominated by the first Salpausselkä ridge, a terminal moraine that cuts through the city from west to east. The city is located in the transition from the southern coastal area to the Finnish Lakeland; prominent to the north of the Salpausselkä are rocky hills and fragmented lakes, while its south side is dominated by forests and small rivers. The divide is also apparent in the soil, which mostly consists of till in the north and clay in the south. The biggest lake is Vesijärvi which also is a gateway to Central Finland via Lake Päijänne. There is also a pond called Pikku-Vesijärvi ("Little Vesijärvi") near the Lanu-puisto park.

Subdivisions 
The area of the city of Lahti is divided in two ways: first, the 40 individually numbered districts, and second, the 9 greater areas, which are divided into 41 statistical districts and further into 169 statistical areas. The definitions of the districts and statistical districts do not necessarily match each other. Below are listed the districts:

 Keski-Lahti
 Kartano
 Paavola
 Niemi
 Kiveriö
 Kivimaa
 Mukkula
 Kilpiäinen
 Pesäkallio
 Kytölä
 Viuha
 Kunnas
 Ahtiala
 Koiskala
 Myllypohja
 Möysä
 Järvenpää
 Kolava
 Kujala
 Kerinkallio
 Ämmälä
 Renkomäki
 Nikkilä
 Laune
 Asemantausta
 Sopenkorpi
 Hennala
 Jokimaa
 Okeroinen
 Kärpänen
 Pirttiharju
 Salpausselkä
 Jalkaranta
 Villähde
 Nastola
 Uusikylä
 Seesta
 Ruuhijärvi
 Immilä
 Pyhäntaka

Climate 
Under the Köppen climate classification, Lahti is right on the boundary between being a humid continental climate (Dfb) and a subarctic climate (Dfc). Summers are usually warm in the city, with the average daily temperature in July exceeding over 23 °C (73.6 °F) and also having had the most 25 °C (77 °F)  (or more) days in the last two decades, alongside Kouvola. Winters are cold and long but as a result of the climate change, specially winters are becoming more and more mild and warm and it is progressively changing from the subarctic climate to humid continental climate, and could already have its climate classified as humid continental climate. During the heatwave of 2010, the temperature in Lahti reached 35.0 °C (95 °F).

Demographics
As of the end of March 2021, the population of Lahti was 120,112, making it the  largest city in Finland by population. The chart below encompasses the area of Lahti as of 2021.

Economy
The economic region of Lahti, which includes the surrounding municipalities, was strongly affected by the collapse of Finnish-Soviet trade and by the recession in the early 1990s. The value of production slumped, especially in the mechanical engineering industry and other manufacturing industries (e.g. the furniture industry). Production also decreased in the textile and clothing industry. In 1990, there were 90,370 jobs in the Lahti region. The number of jobs diminished over the next couple of years, so that in 1993 there were fewer than 70,000 jobs in the region. The number of jobs had slowly increased to 79,138 in 1999.

In 1995, R&D expenditure was FIM 715 per person, while Finland's average was about FIM 2050. The amount of Tekes (the National Technology Agency) funding in the Lahti Region grew 40% during 2004–2007 while the average growth in Finland was 60%.

Culture

Lahti harbors cultural ambitions, manifested notably in the construction of a large congress and concert centre, the Sibelius Hall (2000) by architects Kimmo Lintula and Hannu Tikka. Lahti has one of Finland's most widely known symphony orchestras, the Lahti Symphony Orchestra (Sinfonia Lahti ), based at the Sibelius Hall, which performs both classical and popular music, notably concentrating on music by Jean Sibelius. The orchestra has won several well respected international prizes, and is often heard on BBC Radio 3.

Lahti's annual music festival programme includes such events as Lahti Organ Festival, a jazz festival held in the city's market square and the Sibelius Festival.

In addition to the Sibelius Hall, other additional notable works of architecture in Lahti are the City Hall (1911) by Eliel Saarinen, the Church of the Cross (1978) by Alvar Aalto, Nastola Church (1804), the oldest church in the city, Joutjärvi church, the City Theatre (1983) by Pekka Salminen, the City Library (1990) by Arto Sipinen, the Piano Pavilion (2008) by Gert Wingårdh, and the Travel Centre (2016) by JKMM Architects. The City of Lahti has also acted as the host city for the international Spirit of Wood Architecture Award, established in Finland in 1999. Some of the prize-winners have received commissions to design small structures in the city; these include small works by Japanese architect Kengo Kuma and Australian architect Richard Leplastrier.

Museums and galleries
 Lahti Ski Museum
 Historical Museum of Lahti
 Lahti Art Museum
 Poster museum
 Radio and TV Museum
 Finland’s motorcycle museum
 The Museum of Military Medicine
 Taarasti Art Center

Sports

Winter sports 
Lahti has a rich sporting tradition, especially in various wintersports. The city is well known for the annually held Lahti Ski Games (Salpausselän kisat) and the Finlandia-hiihto cross-country skiing contest. It is also the only city to host the FIS Nordic World Ski Championships seven times, doing so in 1926, 1938, 1958, 1978, 1989, 2001 and 2017.

Ice hockey 
The Pelicans have competed in the top level of Finnish ice hockey, the Liiga, since 1999. Before the new millennium Reipas represented Lahti in top-flight hockey for 50 years. Many former NHL players, such as Janne Laukkanen, Toni Lydman and Pasi Nurminen, have started their careers in Reipas.

Association football 
Historically the city's most successful association football club has been Kuusysi. In their golden years lasting from the early 1980s to the 1990s they won five Finnish championships as well as two Finnish Cup titles, with appearances in European competitions each year. Their greatest rivals, Reipas, won a total of three championships and seven cup titles from 1963 to 1978 but diminished in the early 1980s as Kuusysi got stronger.

In the 1990s both clubs ended up in such massive financial difficulties that a merger was executed in 1996, with the newly formed club adopting a new name, crest and colours. FC Lahti has played in the Veikkausliiga since 1999, excluding a season-long visit to the first division in 2011, having placed twice third and appearing in Europe three times.

Other events 
The 1997 World Games and the 2009 World Masters Athletics Championships were held in Lahti. For the 1952 Summer Olympics, some of the football matches were played at Kisapuisto.

Lahti will host the 2023 Ironman 70.3 World Championship August 26-27, an annual event which rotates venue and is the 2nd most important event in long course triathlon after Kona World Championship held annually in Hawaii.

Transportation

Local transport 
The city is served by 20 local bus lines, most of which are pendulum lines between two different areas via city centre. Bus transport in the Päijänne Tavastia region is organised by the regional transportation authority, known as Lahden seudun liikenne or LSL, and run by several private companies which have bid for the right to run their lines. LSL buses cover all urban areas at 10–20 minute intervals and most nearby municipalities at 30–60 minute intervals.

Lahti is served by VR commuter rail, the Z train to Helsinki and the G train to Riihimäki run hourly. Most services to Kouvola don't have a letter designation and are run every three hours aside from rush hours. There are plans for building two new train stops inside the city limits before 2020, Hennala and Karisto. A local service to Heinola has been proposed but renovating the old line has been deemed too expensive and unprofitable in the long term, unless the Finnish state reaches an agreement with regional councils to finance a direct rail link from Lahti to either Jyväskylä or Mikkeli.

Long-distance transport 

The city's main transportation hubs are the market square (Kauppatori) and the travel centre (Matkakeskus), with local buses providing a non-stop service between the two. The travel centre, which replaced the old Lahti bus station that had been in use since 1939, was built between 2014 and 2016 around the Lahti railway station by building new local bus stops around the station, a long-distance bus terminal next to the station building and an automated parking facility for commuters.

All local and long-distance trains and buses stop at the travel centre, making it convenient to transfer from one mode of transport to another. The city council has sold the old bus station in the city centre and it will be redeveloped for other uses in the near future.

Lahti's proximity to Helsinki provides a fast and well-serviced operation between the cities. Long-distance and commuter trains service the city at least twice an hour in the daytime. There is also a commuter train service towards Riihimäki in the south-west and to Kouvola / Kotka in the east. All the east and north-east long-distance train services to and from Helsinki railway station call at Lahti. From Lahti, it is also convenient to travel to Helsinki airport. Travel time to Helsinki airport via Tikkurila station is between 49min to 65min.

In addition, as an international train service, a high-speed Allegro-train between Helsinki and Saint Petersburg, Russia calls at Lahti. The travel time from Lahti to Saint Petersburg is approx. 2,5 hours. There is also a night-train service from Helsinki to Moscow which calls at Lahti.

Additionally to the train connections, the long-distance busses are well-serviced in Lahti. Thanks to its geographical location, Lahti provides a hub-like possibility for busses too. From Lahti, the long-distance busses service routes to Helsinki, Turku, Tampere, Jyväskylä, Mikkeli, Oulu, Rovaniemi amongst the other destinations.

Education

Comprehensive and private education 
Lahti has 16 comprehensive schools and eight secondary schools. Comprehensive education is also available in English and Swedish. Lahden yhteiskoulu is the city's only private school offering both comprehensive and upper secondary education.

Upper secondary and vocational education 
All four upper secondary schools in Lahti have a specialty: the Lyceum has expertise on subjects such as mathematics and biology, and sports (formerly in Salpauselkä), Tiirismaa focuses on music in association with the Lahti Conservatory, Kannas organises theatre classes and Lahden yhteiskoulu offers an economy-centered class.

Salpaus is an educational consortium owned by the municipalities in Päijänne Tavastia arranging most of the region's vocational education and trade schooling. The privately owned Dila and Lahti Conservatory educate students for healthcare and music-related professions, respectively.

Higher education and LUT University 
Lahti's greatest educational assets are the Lappeenranta-Lahti University of Technology LUT as well as also highly valued Institute of Design and Fine Arts, which is a part of LAB University of Applied Sciences.

LUT University offers education in engineering science as well as in business and management. The Institute of Design and Fine Arts has gained international recognition in particular for jewelry and industrial design, while other areas of expertise include metal, woodworking and furniture.

There are two national sports institutes in greater Lahti. The Vierumäki International Sports Institute based in Heinola is the most versatile centre of sports and physical education in the country, operating under the Ministry of Culture and Education. In addition the Pajulahti Sports Institute, located in the district of Nastola in Lahti, is one of the leading sports and training centres in Finland.

Furthermore one of Finland's six multidisciplinary university campuses is based in Lahti. The University of Helsinki's Department of Environmental Sciences is the university's sole science department located outside the Greater Helsinki area.

Trivia
The asteroid 1498 Lahti was named after the city by its discoverer, the Finnish astronomer Yrjö Väisälä.

Lahti won the European Green Capital Award of the year 2021.

Notable people from Lahti

International relations

Twin towns—sister cities
Lahti is twinned with:

 Västerås, Sweden (since 1940)
 Akureyri, Iceland (since 1947)
 Randers, Denmark (since 1947)
 Ålesund, Norway (since 1947)
 Zaporizhzhya, Ukraine (since 1953)
 Pécs, Hungary (since 1956)
 Garmisch-Partenkirchen, Germany (since 1987)
 Suhl, Germany (since 1988)
 Kaluga, Russia (since 1994)
 Narva, Estonia (since 1994, partnership agreement)
 Deyang, Sichuan, China (since 2000)
 Wuxi, Jiangsu, China (since 2011)
 Norberg, Sweden
 Tamsalu, Estonia

See also
Hollola
Lahti Highway
Lahti Summit
Launeen keskuspuisto
Nastola

References

External links

1952 Summer Olympics official report. pp. 62–3.
 City of Lahti – Official city website.
 Lahti Guide – information for visitors to Lahti.
 Lahti region - Living, business and travel information.
 Lahti info - News, events, business and other information.
 Lahti video - documentary about city of Lahti

Maps
Map Service

Media
Etelä-Suomen Sanomat – local newspaper in Finnish (translates as South Finland News)

 
Cities and towns in Finland
Municipalities of Päijät-Häme
Grand Duchy of Finland
Populated places established in 1905
Ski areas and resorts in Finland
Inland port cities and towns in Finland
Venues of the 1952 Summer Olympics
Olympic football venues
Populated lakeshore places in Finland
1905 establishments in Finland